Alfonso "Al the Pizza Man" Tornabene (1923 – May 17, 2009) was a Chicago-area resident who was reported by several newspapers to have been a high-ranking member of the Chicago Outfit crime organization.

Career as a pizzeria owner 

In 1955, Tornabene opened the Villa Nova pizzeria in Stickney, Illinois.  He and his family later expanded the business to three other locations around Chicago. In 2015 and 2020 it was voted as serving Chicago's best pizza.

Career in the Chicago Outfit 

Tornabene began his career in the Outfit as a bookie.  However, he never had a criminal record of any kind. He was a long time member of the Chicago Heights Street Crew.

In 1997, Tornabene was identified by the Chicago Crime Commission in its "New Faces of Organized Crime" book as being a member of the Chicago Outfit crime organization.  Tornabene was identified as being a lieutenant for the Outfit's West Side Crew, which at that time was run by Anthony Centracchio.

Subsequently, Tornabene was identified as having helped to run the Chicago Outfit while its then-boss, James Marcello, was imprisoned between 1992 and 2003.

Court records also showed that Tornabene had presided over a 1983 ceremony that made several mobsters full members of the Outfit, including Frank Calabrese, Sr. and Nicholas Calabrese.  Tornabene had presided over the ceremony along with Joseph Aiuppa, Nicholas Calabrese told federal investigators. Several other men were apparently inducted at the ceremony, though due to their age and standing in the organization, they are thought to have been re-inducted.

In 2007, the Chicago Crime Commission's then-chief, James Wagner, told the Chicago Tribune that Tornabene was running the Outfit's activities in Chicago's south suburbs.

In 2009, Tornabene was identified as having been an original target in the Operation Family Secrets mob investigation in 2002, an investigation that ultimately sent Chicago Outfit members James Marcello, Joseph Lombardo and Frank Calabrese, Sr. to federal prison for life.  However, Tornabene was never charged in the Family Secrets case.

One of Tornabene's associates, Anthony Zizzo, disappeared on August 31, 2006 after leaving his house in Westmont, Illinois.  Zizzo's car was abandoned at a restaurant in Melrose Park, Illinois.

Death 

Tornabene died on May 17, 2009 at MacNeal Hospital in Berwyn, Illinois of complications related to peptic ulcer disease.

Personal 

Tornabene's wife died in 1988.  He was survived by one daughter, a sister and a granddaughter.

Tornabene was reported to be the cousin of Chicago Outfit boss Samuel Carlisi.  He also was reported to have been the brother of the late Frank Tornabene, who was active in Chicago Outfit vice rackets.

Tornabene lived for most of his life in Stickney, Illinois.

Contrary to what was reported by ABC news, Al Tornabene is not related by marriage to Rod Blagojevich, nor is he related to Frank Tornabene, he had 2 brothers (Sam and Roy) and one sister.

References 

1923 births
2009 deaths
American gangsters of Italian descent
Chicago Outfit bosses
Chicago Outfit mobsters
People from Cook County, Illinois
Deaths from ulcers